The Audit can refer to:
The Audit (Golden Girls episode) - an episode of The Golden Girls
 Audenshaw School#The Audit - a school magazine.